Salvatore Russo (born 12 July 1971) is a retired Italian footballer. Russo played over 180 matches at Serie B and 200 matches at Serie C1.

Career
Russo started his professional career at Serie C1 and Serie C2 clubs. In January 2000, he was signed by Ancona at Serie C1 and followed the team promoted to Serie A in 2003. He played his first Serie A match on 31 August 2003, a 0–2 loss to A.C. Milan. He played 8 more at Serie A before left for Salernitana of Serie B in January 2004. In August 2004, he was signed by league rival Ternana. He followed the club relegated to Serie C1 in mid-2006 but in January 2007 Russo was re-signed by Salernitana, now at Serie C1. He won Serie C1 Champion in 2008 and at the team that avoid relegation by finished in mid-table but 1 point away from relegation zone.

Honours
Serie C1 Champion: 2008

External links
 aic.football.it
 gazzetta.it
 

Italian footballers
S.S. Fidelis Andria 1928 players
S.S.C. Napoli players
A.C. Ancona players
U.S. Salernitana 1919 players
Ternana Calcio players
Serie A players
Sportspeople from the Province of Barletta-Andria-Trani
1971 births
Living people
Association football midfielders
Association football defenders
S.S. Ischia Isolaverde players
Footballers from Apulia